Linda Smith's A Brief History of Timewasting was a BBC Radio 4 situation comedy show written by and starring Linda Smith. It ran for two series of six episodes each from July 2001 until July 2002.

Set in East London, where Smith herself lived, A Brief History of Timewasting concerned the struggle of a single woman to fill the day, helped by her inept, sugar-loving, live-in builder Chris (Chris Neill), morbid elderly neighbour Betty (Margaret John), and minicab driver Worra (Femi Elufowoju Jr). Supporting roles were played by Jeremy Hardy and Martin Hyder. Many familiar voices from Radio 4, including then-chief announcer Peter Donaldson, Thought for the Day regular Rabbi Lionel Blue, and Woman's Hour stalwart Jenni Murray, appeared as themselves.

The programme's page on the Radio 4 website says that the show was set in an East London tower block, but details of Chris's building work demonstrate that Linda and Betty lived in neighbouring terraced houses.

Following Smith's death in 2006, Jeremy Hardy revealed that Linda had been working on a third series.

Episodes

Series 1

Series 2

References

Further reading 
 Lavalie, John. "Linda Smith's A Brief History of Timewasting." at epguides
Episode Guide at RadioListings

External links
BBC Radio 4 page
Modern (less informative) BBC page

BBC Radio comedy programmes
2001 radio programme debuts
BBC Radio 4 programmes